Florence Pernel (born 30 June 1962) is a French actress.

Early life
Pernel was born on 30 June 1962 in Paris.

She began her acting career at the age of 10 with the TV serial Plein soleil and two years later she made her film debut with Just Jaeckin-directed Girls. At age 16 she visited a theater class from Didier Betourne that allowed her a scholarship from the Foundation of Marcel Bleu-Blanchet. From 1991 to 1992 she studied at Studio Pygmalion with Professor Pascal Luneau and from 1993 to 1997, she again took acting classes at Didier Betourne.

Career

Film
She had her breakthrough as an adult when she played the character of Sandrine in the 1993 drama film Three Colors: Blue directed by Krzysztof Kieslowski.  She acted alongside Juliette Binoche and Benoît Régent in the film, and her role earned her a César award nomination in the "Best female debut" category.

In 2000 she played the role of Helene-Anne in the Spanish-language political drama Yoyes directed by Helena Taberna. Her co-stars were Denis Podalydès, who played Sarkozy, and Bernard Le Coq. The film was screened at the 2011 Cannes Film Festival.

TV 
She has also acted in several TV movies.  In 2009 she played the lead role of Caroline Delaume in the six-part French television series Mes amis, mes amours, mes emmerdes.

Personal life 
She is the wife of the historian . The couple has two children.

References

External links 

 Her page on a portal dedicated to francophone actresses
 

Living people
1962 births
French film actresses
French television actresses
Actresses from Paris
20th-century French actresses
21st-century French actresses